Tiago Melo Almeida (born 28 August 2001) is a Portuguese professional footballer who plays as a right-back for Portuguese side Tondela.

Career 
On 13 August 2020 he signed his first professional contract for Tondela.

Career statistics

Club

Notes

References

2001 births
Living people
People from Anadia, Portugal
Portuguese footballers
Association football defenders
Primeira Liga players
Anadia F.C. players
C.D. Tondela players
Sportspeople from Aveiro District